John Ramshaw is a football coach and non-league manager. He is the assistant-manager of Kettering Town.

Career
Ramshaw began his career in 1978. His first opportunity to coach was with the youth team at Notts County, from 1978 until 1983. He gained his English FA Full Licence (UEFA A Licence equivalent) in 1981.

In 1984 Ramshaw joined Shepshed Charterhouse as player-coach in the Southern Premier League. Struggling in the bottom three when he joined them Shepshed finished in fifth place, narrowly missing out on promotion to the Football Conference.

The following year Ramshaw returned to the professional game with Nottingham Forest looking after their Associate Schoolboy programme for two years.

He returned to non-League management with Oakham United in the Central Midlands Football League in 1986, signing a young Dion Dublin (before facilitating his move to Norwich City) and leading the club to the CML League Cup semi-finals.

1989 saw him become Manager of Sutton Town then of the Northern Counties East League and the club embarked on one of the most successful periods in their history, as they were runners up in the Northern Counties East league and League Cup semi-finalists in the three years Ramshaw was with the Snipes.

In 1994, he became the first team coach at the newly renamed Shepshed Dynamo, leading them through the 1994–95 season in the Midland Football Alliance.

In March 1995, he accepted the opportunity to become Manager of Hucknall Town replacing Ted Mullane. In the seven seasons Ramshaw was at the helm the club, they won the Northern Counties East League and were runners up in the Northern Premier League First Division the following season. They won the Northern Counties East League Cup two years in succession and also the Northern Counties East Football League Presidents Cup. They won the Notts Senior Cup three times. They were also runners up once losing to Arnold Town. They reached the semi-finals of the Northern Premier League Challenge Cup. The last 16 was reached FA Vase was reach in 1999 .
He also made one appearance on the substitutes bench.

In addition, Ramshaw led Hucknall Town's Youth Academy (the first full-time non-league academy in the Midlands) to the Northern Alliance U19 League Championship and first round proper of FA Youth Cup.

November 2001 saw Ramshaw join Eastwood Town as the assistant manager to Bryan Chambers. 

Ramshaw joined Northern Premier League club Leek Town in May 2002, taking Paul Cox with him as his assistant. The 2002/03 season saw Leek Town finish in ninth position.

The following season Ramshaw joined Kidsgrove Athletic, leading them to success in the Staffordshire Senior Cup final by beating Conference side Stafford Rangers at the Brittania Stadium. They also reached the semi-finals of the Northern Premier League Chairman's Cup.

Ramshaw joined Phil Starbuck at Arnold Town during the 2003–04 season. This was followed by Arnold Town's most successful league campaign for ten seasons and their best-ever run in the FA Vase (fifth round). 

Ramshaw again joined Phil Starbuck at Northern Premier League club Hednesford Town. 

Ramshaw left Hednesford for Lincoln United in October 2007. However, after only ten games in charge, he left to rejoin Eastwood Town as Paul Cox's assistant. During the next two seasons the pair guided Eastwood Town to the Unibond Northern Premier League championship and promotion to the Football Conference (North); the third round proper of the FA Cup; the Peter Swales Trophy and the Nottinghamshire Senior Cup.

In May 2011, Ramshaw was appointed first team manager of Shepshed Dynamo.

He returned to Eastwood Town as manager in November 2011 but left once again in October 2012, resigning due to ongoing financial difficulties at the club. Despite the club's problems Ramshaw still managed to guide Eastwood Town to a Nottinghamshire Senior Cup Final victory, the fifth time he had won this trophy in his career.

Ramshaw renewed his association with Paul Cox in November 2012 when he joined the coaching staff at Mansfield Town – where he was most recently Academy Manager at the League 2 side. His stewardship of the club's Academy saw 8 players progress to the professional ranks. In addition, the Youth Team won the HKL Development League, were twice runners up in the Football Conference Youth Alliance and were the only League 2 side to reach the fourth round of the FA Youth Cup (2014/15 season). Ramshaw left the Stags in December 2014 following Cox's resignation.

On 29 June 2015 Ramshaw was once again reunited with Paul Cox, becoming assistant manager at National League side Torquay United.

In July 2018 he joined Hinckley AFC as assistant manager to James Jepson. Upon the resignation of Jepson in December 2018, Ramshaw was appointed the club's Manager. After the 2018/19 season, John Ramshaw left the club and later agreed to take over Hinckley's under 18's side.

On 24 October 2019, Ramshaw joined National League North club Kettering Town as assistant manager.

References

Hucknall Town F.C. managers
Hucknall Town F.C. players
Nottingham Forest F.C. players
Notts County F.C. players
Hartlepool United F.C. players
Newcastle United F.C. players
Footballers from Newcastle upon Tyne
Living people
Year of birth missing (living people)
Sutton Town A.F.C. players
Oakham United F.C. (Nottinghamshire) players
Shepshed Dynamo F.C. managers
Oakham United F.C. managers
Sutton Town A.F.C. managers
Leek Town F.C. managers
Arnold Town F.C. non-playing staff
Kidsgrove Athletic F.C. managers
Lincoln United F.C. managers
Eastwood Town F.C. managers
Association footballers not categorized by position
English footballers
English football managers
Northern Counties East Football League players
Nottingham Forest F.C. non-playing staff